Barbara Marie Brown (born July 21, 1953 in Denver, Colorado) is an American former figure skater.  She competed in pairs with partner Doug Berndt.  The duo twice won the bronze medal at the U.S. Figure Skating Championships and competed in the 1972 Winter Olympics.

Results
(pairs with Doug Berndt)

References
Sports-Reference.com

1953 births
Living people
American female pair skaters
Olympic figure skaters of the United States
Figure skaters at the 1972 Winter Olympics
21st-century American women
20th-century American women